Nikolce Klečkarovski (born 17 May 1983) is a Macedonian football player who previously plays as a striker at Pahang FA. Now, He is free agent.

Club career
The  29-year-old  centre forward,  born  in  Struga, moved  to  Đà Nẵng  in  January  2012  and  scored  four  goals  in  the past  season  of  the  Vietnamese  V-League.  Before  his  move  to  Asia  he  played  short  time  for  Makedonija Gjorche Petrov  in  the  Macedonian Second League,  though  in  the  past  he  played  for  several  teams  from  the  Macedonian First League.

Kleckaroski  played  two  games  in  the  UEFA Champions League  with FK Makedonija.

References

External links
 Pahang sign two strikers for new season

1983 births
Living people
Sportspeople from Struga
Association football forwards
Macedonian footballers
FK Horizont Turnovo players
FK Makedonija Gjorče Petrov players
FK Metalurg Skopje players
FK Teteks players
SHB Da Nang FC players
Sri Pahang FC players
FK Mladost Carev Dvor players
Macedonian First Football League players
Macedonian Second Football League players
Malaysia Super League players
Macedonian expatriate footballers
Expatriate footballers in Vietnam
Expatriate footballers in Malaysia
Macedonian expatriate sportspeople in Malaysia